This is a list of franchise records for the Colorado Avalanche of the National Hockey League. These include records held by both the Avalanche and the Quebec Nordiques.

Team records

Single season

Single game

Streaks

† Denotes an NHL record.

Individual records
Career

Season

Single game

See also
List of Colorado Avalanche players
List of NHL statistical leaders
Team records in the National Hockey League
Individual records in the National Hockey League

References

 National Hockey League National Hockey League Official Guide & Record Book, 2008'' (2007). 

Records
National Hockey League statistical records
History of Colorado Avalanche